Charles Wesley Robinson (September 7, 1919 – May 20, 2014) was an American entrepreneur who was involved with many successful business adventures in the mining and shipping industry. He also served as United States Deputy Secretary of State. He was president of CBTF Co. and M Ship Co., a board member of Nike and Chairman of Nike’s Finance Committee.

Biography
Robinson was born in Long Beach, California, and spent his early years on a ranch overlooking the Antelope Valley in the Western Mojave Desert. He received his bachelor's degree cum laude in international economics from the University of California, Berkeley in 1941. After graduating from a 90-day engineering program at the United States Naval Academy in May 1942, he stayed on as an instructor for another year.

He then received an assignment to the heavy cruiser USS Tuscaloosa and spent nearly two years on the treacherous Murmansk run. The young lieutenant found himself in charge of the main engine division on the ship during the D-Day landing of Normandy, during which the Tuscaloosa engaged in a long battle with a German battery (reported by the Pulitzer Prize-winning war correspondent Ira Wolfert in the August 1944 issue of Reader's Digest).

After further duty in the Pacific at Iwo Jima and Okinawa, in February 1946, Robinson had earned enough points to be discharged from the Navy and left for Palo Alto, California, to enter the Stanford University Business School. He graduated with a business degree through an accelerated program in May 1947.

He died on May 20, 2014, aged 94, in Santa Fe, New Mexico.

Timeline
1941–45 US Navy Engineering Officer
1947–49 Golden State Dairy. Managed the company’s manufacturing plants in California. Received several patents for creative, but not necessarily successful ideas, including “Nucaroma”—which packaged the smell of a new car in an aerosol can. Became president of a new startup subsidiary company—Harvestaire Corp.
1950 McKinsey & Company. Served as management consultant to Meier & Frank.
1951–52 Utah Construction Company. Sent to Panama to set up a timber operation.
1952–74 Founder and President of the Marcona Mining Company (financed by Utah Construction Company and Cyprus Mines), which began by operating an iron ore mine out of San Juan, Peru. (This region was named the District of Marcona by the Peruvian government in 1955.) The Marcona board members from Utah Construction consisted of Mariner Eccles, Ed Littlefield and Alan Christensen see photo. Through Robinson’s innovative vision, the Marcona company expanded into the shipping industry. In an effort to support the transport of iron ore to Japan, Robinson continued to push for larger ships eventually designing and in 1961 constructing the first Panamax, the largest vessel to navigate the Panama Canal. This 105,000-ton ship received much press coverage at the time. Other innovations included the development of a slurry system (Marconaflo) to transport iron ore from mine into and out of ships in a fluid state and development of the first joint oil/ore carriers.
1950–74 Mining/steel operations and port development in Brazil, Saudi Arabia, New Zealand, Australia, India and Chile. This includes establishment of Samarco (joint venture between Marcona and Samitri, a Brazilian company) through which iron ore mined at Minas Gerais (Brazil) was transported via slurry pipeline to a port they developed at Ponta Ubu. Robinson selected Al-Jubail (Saudi Arabia) as the location to develop a port to deliver the iron ore and develop Saudi Arabia's first steel mill. Oil was then transported back to Brazil from Saudi Arabia in the same ships.
1974 Appointed as Undersecretary of State for Economic Affairs during the Gerald Ford administration. Newsweek Magazine (November 3, 1975) referred to Robinson as a ‘Maverick’ and “A master of statecraft”.
1976 Appointed as United States Deputy Secretary of State (Number two ranking position in the State Department then headed by Henry Kissinger). Negotiated the US-Soviet grain deal, among other accomplishments.
1976 Kuhn, Loeb & Co. Wall Street investment banking firm. Senior Managing Partner.
1977 Blyth, Eastman, Dillon. Wall Street investment banking firm. Vice-chairman.
1979–87  Founded and was president of ETCO (Energy Transition Corporation) based out of Santa Fe, New Mexico. (The four other stockholders were William J. Casey, William C. Turner, Robert W. Fri, and Frank G. Zarb).
1988–2014. Set up the DynaYacht Company (now CBTF Co.)  based in San Diego, California. Worked with Alberto Calderon, Bill Burns, Matt Brown and Peter Isler to create a radical new appendage design that uses a canting ballast for righting moment and two foils - one forward and one aft of the keel - for side force and steering functions of the yacht. The prototype had been used on the boat called the US in the America’s Cup Race. The Canting Ballast Twin Foil technology (CBTF technology) design won Sailing World’s “Boat of the Year Award" in 2001.
1992–2014. Development of a  ranch near La Cienega, New Mexico.
1998–2014. M-Ship Co. Another concept, the ‘M-Hull’ was originally designed to reduce bow waves to reduce erosion in the canals of Venice, Italy. This technology has been used on an  boat called the M80 Stiletto, under construction by the US Military, as well as a recreational  sailing Dinghy called the Wahoo. The Wahoo received the Bronze award in the 2003 Industrial Design Excellence Awards competition.

Boards and other organizations
Trilateral Commission (one of the original members, joining in 1976)
Brookings Institution
Arthur D. Little
North American Institute
Allen Group (Allen Telecom)
Northrop Corporation
Clark Oil, Inc.
Pan American Airways
Nike, Inc. (Board of directors since 1977; Chairman of the Finance committee; until 2004)
Mills College (trustee)
Pacific Basin Economic Council
Santa Fe Concert Association

Family
Robinson was married since 1957 to Mara (Lindovna) Robinson, who was a founder of the Opera-West Company in San Francisco in the 1950s and was active in the '60s in trying to dissolve racial barriers. She has served on many boards including the San Francisco Opera Company, St. John's College and Save Venice Inc. They have three daughters, Heather L. Robinson (b. 1957), Lisa A. Robinson (b. 1959) and Wendy P. Robinson (b. 1962).

References

Further reading
Uncharted Seas. Autobiography written by Charles W. Robinson with Don J. Usner

Quotes
“If I knew ahead of time, it wouldn’t be any fun”—Reply in response to a San Francisco Business magazine reporter’s question in 1974 as to what Robinson thought he would accomplish in the job of Under-Secretary of State.

“Management by self-induced crisis”—Robinson’s description of his business style.

"No one who has any self-doubts would ever wear a bow-tie"—Robinson quoted in a New York Times article April 22, 1979 on the returning fashion of bow-ties (Robinson had always worn a bow tie)

External links
 Mr. Robinson manager at M Ship Co.

American businesspeople
1919 births
2014 deaths
United States Deputy Secretaries of State
Nixon administration personnel
Ford administration personnel
Stanford Graduate School of Business alumni
University of California, Berkeley alumni
United States Navy personnel of World War II